Besnik Prenga (born 5 June 1969) is an Albanian retired football player and current coach who most recently managed Laçi in the Albanian Superliga.

Club career
Prenga played the majority of his career in Croatia. He was at Dinamo Zagreb between 1997 and 1998 but featured in only one Champions League game.

International career
Prenga has been an Albania international for two years, making two appearances between 1992 and 1994.

Managerial career
Prenga begun his managerial career with the under-19 side of NK Hrvatski Dragovoljac. In the 2016–17 season, he led NK Lokomotiva U19 to their first championship after a goalless draw versus Dinamo Zagreb U19 in May 2017.

NK Lučko
On 12 June 2017, after two years without a senior club, Prenga joined Lučko for the 2017–18 season. His spell wasn't successful, as he was in charge for only four matches before being sacked in September.

Laçi
On 6 June 2018, Prenga signed a one-year contract with Laçi of Albanian Superliga. His first game in charge was the first leg of 2018–19 UEFA Europa League first qualifying round against Anorthosis Famagusta. The team lost 2–1 at Antonis Papadopoulos Stadium despite scoring first. In the second leg, Prenga won his first match as Laçi manager thanks to a late winner of Myrto Uzuni for a 1–0 win, which was enough to clinch the qualification by the away-goal rule.

Personal life
His son Herdi is also a professional footballer at Inter Zaprešić. His niece Arjola is a professional volleyball player in Norway.

Career statistics

Managerial

References

External links

1969 births
Living people
People from Mirditë
Association football midfielders
Albanian footballers
Albania international footballers
KS Kastrioti players
FK Partizani Tirana players
NK Istra players
NK Zadar players
HNK Suhopolje players
Maccabi Petah Tikva F.C. players
NK Čakovec players
Kategoria Superiore players
Liga Leumit players
Albanian expatriate footballers
Expatriate footballers in Croatia
Expatriate footballers in Israel
Albanian expatriate sportspeople in Croatia
Albanian expatriate sportspeople in Israel
Albanian football managers
Kategoria Superiore managers
NK Hrvatski Dragovoljac managers
KF Laçi managers
Albanian expatriate football managers
Expatriate football managers in Croatia